Bishop's Cleeve Football Club is a semi-professional football club based in Bishop's Cleeve, near Cheltenham, Gloucestershire, England. Nicknamed 'The Mitres', the club are affiliated to the Gloucestershire County FA.

History
Formed in 1905, the club initially played in the Cheltenham League. They won Division Two in 1924–25 and again in 1930–31. After being promoted to Division One, they won the league title in 1931–32 and 1934–35. After World War II they won Division Two in 1958–59, before going on to win Division One in 1961–62 and 1963–64. Following back-to-back titles in 1965–66 and 1966–67, the club moved up to Division Two of the Gloucestershire Northern Senior League. They won Division Two at the first attempt, and after earning promotion to Division One, went on to win back-to-back titles in 1968–69 and 1969–70. A third Division One title was won in 1972–73.

In 1983 Bishop's Cleeve moved up to Division One of the Hellenic League. They won the division in 1986–87, earning promotion to the Premier Division. They won the Premier Division Cup in 1987–88, but were relegated back to Division One after finishing bottom of the Premier Division in 1991–92. League restructuring in 2000 saw them placed in Division One West, and after finishing as runners-up in 2000–01, they were promoted back to the Premier Division. In 2005–06 the club finished as Premier Division runners-up, earning promotion to Division One Midlands of the Southern League. They were transferred to Division One South & West in 2008. After finishing bottom of the division in 2017–18, the club were relegated to the Premier Division of the Hellenic League. In 2021–22 they won the Hellenic League title, earning promotion back to the Southern League.

Ground
The club originally played at a ground on Stoke Road. It was redeveloped in the early 1970s, and was officially reopened by FA Secretary Ted Croker in 1971. However, by the 1990s the club were required to leave Stoke Road to maintain their Hellenic League status, resulting in them spending several seasons groundsharing at Moreton Town, Wollen Sports, Forest Green Rovers and Evesham United. Permission was given for a new ground at Kayte Lane in 1997 and following a new stand and floodlights being installed, the club returned to the town in 2002. A new clubhouse was completed in 2004. It has a capacity of 1,500, of which 50 is covered seating.

During refurbishments in 2021–22, including the installation of an artificial pitch and new floodlights, the club played at Evesham United's Jubilee Stadium.

Honours
Hellenic League
Premier Division champions; 2021–22
Premier Division Cup winners; 1987–88
Division One champions; 1986–87
Gloucestershire Northern Senior League
Division One champions; 1968–69, 1969–70, 1972–73
Division Two champions; 1967–68
Cheltenham League
Division One champions; 1931–32, 1934–35, 1961–62, 1963–64, 1965–66, 1966–67
Division Two champions; 1924–25, 1930–31, 1958–59
Senior Charities Cup winners; 1928–29, 1936–37, 1962–63, 1964–65, 1966–67

Records
Highest league position: 11th in Southern League South & West Division, 2011–12
Best FA Cup performance: Fourth qualifying round, 2005–06
Best FA Trophy performance: First qualifying round, 2006–07, 2010–11, 2012–13, 2014–15
Best FA Vase performance: Third round, 2005–06
Record attendance: 1,300 vs Cheltenham Town, July 2006
Most appearances: John Skeen
Most goals: Kevin Slack

See also
Bishop's Cleeve F.C. players
Bishop's Cleeve F.C. managers

References

External links
Official website

 
Football clubs in England
Football clubs in Gloucestershire
Association football clubs established in 1905
1905 establishments in England
Cheltenham Association Football League
Gloucestershire Northern Senior League
Hellenic Football League
Southern Football League clubs